The 2010 Dakar Rally was the 32nd running of the event. It was held in South America for the second successive time, and ran from 1 to 16 January. The Amaury Sport Organisation and the governments of Argentina and Chile agreed to a return to South America for the event in February 2009.

Cyril Despres, riding a KTM, won the motorcycle class for the third time, winning two stages en route to victory by over an hour from any of his rivals. Second place went to another KTM rider, as Pål Anders Ullevålseter finished on the Dakar podium for the first time in his career, taking a stage win on the penultimate day. Aprilia rider Francisco López Contardo finished in third position, just under seven minutes behind Ullevålseter, taking three stage victories. Other stage wins were taken by Sherco's David Casteu, Yamaha's David Frétigné, as well as the KTMs of Rubén Faria and defending class winner Marc Coma; Coma won the most stages in the event, taking four wins. The ATV class was held outwith the motorcycle class for the first time, and was dominated by the Yamaha-riding Patronelli brothers Marcos and Alejandro, who finished first and second in class. Juan Manuel González Corominas finished third on another Yamaha, over five hours behind Marcos Patronelli. The Patronellis took six stage wins, with the other eight shared by the Polaris duo of Hubert Deltrieu, and Christophe Declerck (3), as well as the Yamahas of Sebastian Halpern (2), González Corominas and Rafal Sonik.

Volkswagen won their second Dakar in succession in the cars class, with Carlos Sainz following in the footsteps of team-mate Giniel de Villiers, who won the event in 2009. Sainz finished two minutes clear of another Volkswagen, piloted by Nasser Al-Attiyah, with a third Volkswagen of Mark Miller completing the podium, half an hour behind Al-Attiyah. Al-Attiyah and BMW's Stéphane Peterhansel both won four stages during the event, with other stage wins taken by the Volkswagens of Sainz (2) and Miller, as well as BMW pairing Nani Roma and Guerlain Chicherit, and the Hummer of Robby Gordon. Defending class winner Vladimir Chagin dominated the trucks class, winning nine of the fourteen stages en route to a 73-minute victory over Kamaz team-mate Firdaus Kabirov, with GINAF's Marcel van Vliet a further nine and a half hours behind in third.

Entrants

362 Teams competed in the race with 176 motorcycles and all-terrain vehicles, 134 cars, and 52 trucks on the podium across from the Obelisk, on the 9th of July Avenue; one of Buenos Aires' major boulevards. Notable contenders were former Formula 1 driver Jan Lammers participating for Jumbo Team GINAF in the Truck Class and Formula 1 driver Esteban Tuero competing for Tuero RXZ Racing by MINI in the Car Class.

The route

The race began on New Year's Day in downtown Buenos Aires. Of these distances,  was timed special stage for cars and trucks, with  less for bikes and ATVs. Of the fourteen stages, seven were in Argentina, and seven in Chile.

Stages
 For the first two stages, there were varying distances for Bikes/Quads and Cars/Trucks. The distances of the Bikes/Quads are displayed first.

Stage results
 ↓ Denotes competitor given post-stage penalty which was added to overall time, not stage time.

Motorcycles

Quads

Cars

Trucks

Final overall standings

Motorcycles

Quads

Cars

Trucks

Incidents
Four other fans were injured, two of which were transferred to Córdoba for further treatment.
 A vast number of competitors did not manage to return to the Fiambala bivouac by nightfall at the end of the third stage.
 KTM rider Luca Manca was involved in a serious accident approximately  into the sixth stage. He suffered a brain contusion in the accident, and was transferred by helicopter to Hospital del Cobre Dr. Salvador Allende Gossens in Calama, before being transferred to the neuro-surgical unit of Clínica de la Mutual de Seguridad in Santiago. This came a day after Manca had generously surrendered his rear wheel to defending champion Marc Coma when his fellow KTM rider's tyre burst.
 Stage nine was shortened by  due to fog in the surrounding areas around the stage start at Copiapó.

References

External links
 
 AUSmotive.com – Carlos Sainz and Volkswagen win 2010 Dakar Rally

Dakar Rally
Dakar Rally
Dakar Rally
 Sports competitions in Buenos Aires